Emilios T. Harlaftis (29 March 1965, in Kiato – 13 February 2005, in Mainalo) was an astrophysicist.

Harlaftis obtained an undergraduate degree in physics at the University of Athens in 1987, and a PhD degree at the University of Oxford in 1991, under the supervision of Phil A. Charles. His thesis title was "Disc structure and variability in dwarf novae". From 1991 to 1995 he worked as a support astronomer at the Isaac Newton Group of telescopes of the Royal Greenwich Observatory, placed at the Observatory of Roque de los Muchachos (owned by the Instituto de Astrofisica de Canarias at the island of La Palma.  He then worked as a research assistant (1995–1997) at the University of St. Andrews and as a research fellow (1997–1998) at the Institute of Astronomy and Astrophysics of the National Observatory of Athens, where he was appointed to a position of a tenure track researcher in 1999.  He held a series of posts as a visiting scientist at the University of Sheffield, and the NASA Goddard Space Flight Center (1999), and two years as a temporary Reader at the School of Physics and Astronomy at the University of St. Andrews (2001–2002).   He acted as a principal investigator for the Aristarchos 2.3 m Telescope located at the Chelmos mountain, which colleagues suggested to name after him, following his death in an avalanche accident.

His main research contribution is the co-discovery of spiral waves in a solar-size accretion disk, pioneering analysis determining mass ratios of black hole systems using the Keck-I telescope, contribution to accretion disc physics and finally extensive analysis and image processing using the Doppler tomography technique with applications on interactive binaries resolving emission components such as the inner face of the companion star, the gas stream and the impact region of the gas stream on the accretion disk (bright spot).  The article on this topic he co-wrote has been cited 140 times.

In 2020, the Hellenic Astronomical Society, decided to accept a generous offer of the Harlaftis family and  renamed the best PhD thesis prize awarded biennially to a junior member of the Society,  to "Best PhD thesis prize - Emilios Harlaftis".

References

External links
Harlaftis's Refereed Papers Ordered by Date
Harlaftis's Refereed Papers Ordered by the Number of Citations
Aristarchos telescope

1965 births
2005 deaths
National and Kapodistrian University of Athens alumni
20th-century Greek astronomers
21st-century Greek astronomers
Alumni of the University of Oxford
Academics of the University of Sheffield
Academics of the University of St Andrews
Mountaineering deaths
Greek academics
People from Sikyona